The Lost Jungle (1934) is a Mascot Pictures movie serial. A semi-sequel to this serial, Darkest Africa, was released by Republic Pictures in 1936. Republic was made from a merger of several companies, including Mascot, which became the B-Western and serial production arm of the company, as well as providing them with a studio.

Cast
Clyde Beatty as Clyde Beatty 
Cecilia Parker as Ruth Robinson
Syd Saylor as Larry Henderson
Warner Richmond as Sharkey
Edward LeSaint as Captain Robinson
Wheeler Oakman as Kirby
Maston Williams as Thompson
Max Wagner as Slade
George 'Gabby' Hayes as Doctor - Dirigible Passenger

Release
In an unusual move, a feature film version was made simultaneously with the serial by re-filming several principal scenes with different dialog, and several other principal scenes altogether new, particularly the ending, thereby creating an essentially new and different story.

Chapter titles
 Noah's Ark Island
 Nature in the Raw
 The Hypnotic Eye
 The Pit of Crocodiles
 Gorilla Warfare
 The Battle of Beasts
 The Tiger's Prey
 The Lion's Brood
 Eyes of the Jungle
 Human Hyenas
 The Gorilla
 Take Them Back Alive
Source:

References

External links
 
 
 

1934 films
American black-and-white films
1930s English-language films
1934 adventure films
Films set in Africa
Mascot Pictures film serials
Films directed by Armand Schaefer
Films directed by David Howard
1930s romance films
Films produced by Nat Levine
American romance films
American adventure films
1930s American films